Ian Watson (born 10 April 1934) was a Liberal party member of the House of Commons of Canada. Born in Howick, Quebec, he was a lawyer by career.

He first won office at Quebec's Châteauguay—Huntingdon—Laprairie riding in the 1963 federal election and was re-elected in 1965, 1968, 1972 and 1974. His riding was changed to La Prairie in 1968.

In the 1979 election, Watson campaigned and won in the Châteauguay riding and was re-elected there in 1980. He was defeated in the 1984 election by Ricardo Lopez of the Progressive Conservative party.

Watson served seven successive terms from the 26th to the 32nd Canadian Parliaments.

Electoral history

References

1934 births
Living people
Canadian Presbyterians
Members of the House of Commons of Canada from Quebec
Liberal Party of Canada MPs
People from Montérégie
Canadian lawyers